Dreamcatcher Company is a South Korean entertainment company established in 2008.

History

2008–2010: Establishment, name change and mainstream breakthrough
The label was established on August 15, 2008, as Harvest Entertainment (풍년 엔터테인먼트) by Lee Joowon.  The label changed their name to Happyface Entertainment (해피페이스 엔터테인먼트) on January 23, 2009.

Rap-pop duo One Two (previously established in 2003), signed a contract with Happyface Entertainment in early 2009.  The duo released "Starry Night", "Bad Girl (ft. Seo In-young), "Walala Lalale", and "Very Good" before their disbandment in late 2010.

The agency briefly worked with HybRefine and Sanchez, now known as Phantom, in 2010 to produce the singles "You Can Fly", "Cosmic Dance", "Rain U", and "Sanchez-San Toi".

2011–2015: Debuting artist, joint venture and development
Following the success of E-Tribe's productions, the label made the decision to debut their first idol girl group, Dal Shabet.

On May 4, 2011, it was announced that Happyface Entertainment would be merging with Y-WHO Enterprise, small entertainment agency founded by ex-4men member, and current Vibe member, Yoon Min-soo. With the merger, Y-WHO Enterprise artists 4men, Bebe Mignon and MIIII officially became label-mates of Nassun and Dal Shabet.

In mid-2012, it was revealed that Bebe Mignon members Haegeum and Park Ga-Eul had left Happyface Entertainment, effectively disbanding the group. Member Ben has since been re-debuted by the agency as a solo artist.

Actress Yeon Mi-Ju of the hit television series Lovers signed an exclusive contract with Happyface Entertainment on May 21, 2014.

On July 31, 2014, famous breakdancer and recording artist Nam Hyun-joon and his wife Park Aeri joined the company.

In September 2014, Happyface Entertainment debuted MINX, its first girl group since Dal Shabet three years prior.

In 2015, returning vocal group V.O.S. signed with Happyface for their comeback.

2017–present: Dreamcatcher, sub-labels and second name change
In January 2017, Happyface Entertainment re-formed MINX to be a seven-member girl group as Dreamcatcher.

Happyface Entertainment launched their first sub-label, HF Music Company. 

On January 31, 2017, Kpop Star 5 contestant Lee Si-eun signed an exclusive contract with HF Music Company. 

In August 2017, the label debuted trio Classmate.

In December 2017, Dal Shabet members Serri, Subin and Ah Young parted ways with the company following the expiration of their contracts. The group, however, was said to not be disbanded, and future activities of the four-member group remains to be discussed.

In June 2018, Woo Jin-young finished first place on Mixnine. The company filed a lawsuit against YG following the cancellation of the group that was set to debut.

On February 13, 2019, Happyface Entertainment announced they will rename to Dreamcatcher Company. 

In March 2019, following announcement of D1CE's debut, a sub-label named D1CE Company was set up.

In November 2022, all seven members of Dreamcatcher renewed their contracts early, before the end of their existing contracts.

In January 2023, D1CE disbanded after 3 years and 5 months.

Artists

Recording artists

Dreamcatcher Company
Groups
 Dreamcatcher
Soloists
 Siyeon (Dreamcatcher)
 Handong (Dreamcatcher)

HF Music Company
Groups
 Classmate
Soloists
 Lee Si Eun
 Heo Seong Jeong (Classmate)
 Jae Seong (Classmate)

Producers
 Nu;face

Singer-songwriters
 Dami
 Woo Jin-young
 Park Woo-dam
 Siyeon
 JiU
 Yoohyeon
 Handong
 SuA
 Gahyeon
 Byeong Min

Actors
 Lee Seung-ho

Former artists
Recording artists
 One Two  (2009–2010)
 HybRefine (2010–2011)
 Sanchez (2010–2011)
 Bebe Mignon (2010–2012)
 Haegeum (2010–2012)
 Park Ga-eul (2010–2012)
 E-Tribe (2008-2012)
 Dal Shabet
 Viki (2011–2012)
 Jiyul (2011–2015)
 Kaeun (2011–2015)
 Serri (2011–2017)
 Ah Young (2011–2017)
 Subin (2011–2017)
 Woohee (2012–2018)
 4Men (2011–2017)
 Kim Young-jae (2008–2014)
 Ben (2011–2017)
 MIIII (2011–2017)
 V.O.S (2015–2017)
 Nam Hyun-joon
 Park Aeri
 HNB
 D1ce (2019–2023)

Producers
 E-Tribe (2009–2012)

Actors
 Yeon Mi-ju (2014–????)
 Kim Ji-sung

References

Labels distributed by CJ E&M Music and Live
Labels distributed by Kakao M
Labels distributed by Universal Music Group
Record labels established in 2008
South Korean record labels